The  is a skyscraper located in Chūō, Tokyo, Japan. Construction of the 221-meter, 51-story skyscraper was finished in 1994.

Tenants
 Arysta LifeScience Corporation   
 Credit Pricing Corporation   
 Sanki Engineering Co., Ltd.  
 Sojitz Cosmetics Corporation  
 UMG ABS, Ltd.

References

External links

  

Office buildings completed in 1994
Buildings and structures in Chūō, Tokyo
Skyscraper office buildings in Tokyo
Nippon Life
1994 establishments in Japan